Munasinghe or Moonesinghe is a Sinhalese name that may refer to the following people:
 
Surname
Bandu Munasinghe (1936–2005), Sri Lankan actor
Dharma Sri Munasinghe (1930–2004), Sri Lankan radio playwright, film screenwriter and director
Gayashan Munasinghe (born 1986), Sri Lankan-born Italian cricketer
Manjula Munasinghe (born 1971), Sri Lankan cricketer and Australian cricket coach
Mohan Munasinghe, Sri Lankan physicist, academic and economist
P. L. Munasinghe, Sri Lankan rugby player
Priya Munasinghe (1941–2001), Sri Lankan motor racing champion
S. J. Munasinghe, 33rd Surveyor General of Sri Lanka
Sanjeewa Munasinghe (born 1959), Sri Lankan military physician and administrator
Sarath Munasinghe (1949–2008 ), Sri Lankan military officer and politician

See also

Sinhalese surnames